Kim Sunée (born South Korea) is an American memoirist and food writer, known for her 2008 memoir Trail of Crumbs: Hunger, Love, and the Search for Home, published by Grand Central Publishing.

Sunée was abandoned by her mother in a South Korean market at age 3, and adopted by a couple from New Orleans, Louisiana.  At 18, she traveled to Europe to study, first living in France and then Sweden; in Sweden in 1992, she met and entered into a long-term romantic relationship with Olivier Baussan, founder of the L'Occitane en Provence cosmetics company.  Sunée's book tells about her life through her breakup with Baussan, interspersed with recipes.

Sunée's book has received favorable reviews from publications such as the Chicago Tribune, the San Francisco Chronicle, and Epicurious.

After ending her relationship with Baussan, Sunée returned to the United States.  She previously lived in Birmingham, Alabama, where she was food editor for Cottage Living magazine, a Time Warner publication, but has since relocated to Anchorage, Alaska.

References

Mimi Read, "Life as a Repast, Not Yet Complete", New York Times, Feb. 20, 2008

External links
 Official site

Living people
1970 births
American food writers
American memoirists
American writers of Korean descent
Writers from New Orleans
Writers from Birmingham, Alabama
South Korean adoptees
American adoptees
Women food writers
American women memoirists
21st-century American women